Rangubai Junnare English Medium School is a school in Nashik, India.  It  was named after Smt. Rangubai Junnare, a local social worker who donated the land near Dwarka Circle for the school.

History 
The  school was established in 1968.  The school provided education in English language while maintaining an emphasis on Indian culture, tradition and customs. Originally called English Medium School, it had 100 students and four classes.

Today the school has over 3000 students.

Extracurricular 
 Science club
 Interact club (social service, community awareness)
 Educational tours
 Quizzing
 Dramatics
 Value education
 Democratic election

External links 
rjemhs.org

References 

Educational institutions established in 1968
High schools and secondary schools in Mumbai
1968 establishments in Maharashtra